Cheloor is a place in Irinjalakuda municipality, Thrissur district in the Indian state of Kerala. It is around 1 km from the famous Koodalmanikyam Temple.

Location
Cheloor is bordered by Edakulam on the south, Edathirinji on the west, Kanteshwaram on the north and Irinjalakuda town on the east.

Irinjalakuda and Moonupeedika are the nearest towns.

Transportation
Irinjalakuda Municipal Bus Stand and Irinjalakuda KSRTC Bus Stand are the nearest bus stands. Irinjalakuda Railway Station at Kalletumkara is the nearest railway station.

Places of worship 
 Cheloor Kavu
 St. Mary's Church
 Mariyaman Kovil
 Vettathu Ambalam
 Panokkil Ambalam
  Thamarath SreeRama Temple

Bank branches 
 Irinjalakuda Town Co-operative Bank Ltd
•South Indian bank

References

Villages in Thrissur district